Lakateshem (also Romanized as Lākāteshem; also known as Lākatāshūn) is a village in Kharajgil Rural District, Asalem District, Talesh County, Gilan Province, Iran. At the 2006 census, its population was 198, in 36 families.

References 

Populated places in Talesh County